The Hoops Dome is an indoor arena in Lapu-Lapu, Cebu, Philippines. The venue occupies an area of 4,000 square metres. The Hoops Dome was completed in 2008 and was formally opened on July 2, 2011. It has hosted numerous PBA games since opening in 2011, most notably the Visayas leg of the 2017 PBA All-Star Week on April 30, 2017.

List of PBA games played at the Hoops Dome 

* - indicates game played during the 2017 PBA All-Star Week

References

2011 establishments in the Philippines
ASEAN Basketball League venues
Basketball venues in the Philippines
Buildings and structures in Lapu-Lapu City
Indoor arenas in the Philippines
Landmarks in the Philippines
Sports venues completed in 2011